Alphonse Boudard (17 December 1925 – 14 January 2000) was a French novelist and playwright. He won the 1977 Prix Renaudot for Les Combattants du petit bonheur.
Boudard's 1995 novel Dying childhood  was awarded and recognised by the French Academy with a Grand Prix du roman de l'Académie française.

Biography
Boudard was born in Paris, an illegitimate child. He was brought up first by an adoptive family in the Loiret region of  the center of France, then by his grand mother in the south of Paris. Boudard had a late career. As a teenager he was living in a country occupied by the German Army. He was wounded fighting for the French and he was awarded a military medal. His early adult life was spent in casual work, periods in jail and in a sanatorium recovering from tuberculosis. He experimented with writing, but it was not until he was 33 that he decided to be a full-time writer. He credits the writer Albert Paraz with inspiring this move.

His novels are characterised by the colloquial terms and slang that Boudard used to describe life in the 1940s. His works are autobiographical and he uses his periods in a sanatorium and in jail as a basis for his stories. His 1963 novel The Cherry and his 1972 story The Hospital are examples, as is his 1992 novel The amazing Mr Joseph which tells the story of a French spy who becomes a millionaire dealing on the black market during World War II (based on the real career of Joseph Joanovici).

Many of Boudard novels were adapted for French films and television.

Boudard died in Nice on January 14, 2000.

External links 
 Biographie d'Alphonse Boudard
 une biographie d'Alphonse Boudard
 Les gens du cinéma
 André Nolat, Romances de la rue (« Notes sur Mac Orlan, Carco, Simonin, Boudard »), Lyon, éd. Baudelaire, septembre 2009
 Article nécrologique de Marc Laudelout

Writers from Paris
1925 births
2000 deaths
French male screenwriters
20th-century French screenwriters
Prix Renaudot winners
Prix Sainte-Beuve winners
French Resistance members
Grand Prix du roman de l'Académie française winners
20th-century French novelists
20th-century French male writers
French male novelists
Burials at Montparnasse Cemetery